Vineet Kumar Chaudhary (born 3 December 1983) is an Indian television actor. He has appeared in the notable shows  CID,  Jeet Gayi Toh Piya Morey and Shaurya Aur Suhani.

Early life 
Vineet was born into a Hindu family in Delhi. He obtained his formal education from Delhi University. Vineet married Abhilasha Jakhar on 4 February 2018.

Career

Early career (2007–2020)

He started his career with a character Arjun Shekhavat in Anurag Basu TV Series  Love Story. Later he appeared in Shaurya Aur Suhani,  CID,  Jeet Gayi Toh Piya Morey He participated in the sports reality entertainment show Box Cricket League and was the team member of Pune Anmol Ratan. and he received Fogg’s Coolest Player of the Match Award.

Breakthrough (2020–present)
Chaudhary had his breakthrough with the role of Rajesh Shastri in  Prem Bandhan. Chaudhary also appeared in the shows Kumkum Bhagya and Bade Achhe Lagte Hain 2. It was the biggest hit of his television career. From February 2023, he is playing the role of Samrat Singh in Dhruv Tara – Samay Sadi Se Pare.

Television

Music videos

References

External links 
 
 

1983 births
Living people
Indian male television actors
Male actors from Mumbai
Participants in Indian reality television series
Actors from Mumbai